Isaiah Paxson Farm, also known as Burgess Lea, is a historic farm complex located in Solebury Township, Bucks County, Pennsylvania. The complex consists of a house, double barn, carriage house, springhouse, shed, smoke house, and small barnyard building.  All of the buildings are constructed of stone.  The house was built in 1785, and has a -story, three-bay, gable-roofed main section with a -story kitchen section and one-story shed addition.  It is in the Georgian style.

It was added to the National Register of Historic Places in 1984.

References

External links
 Paxson Barn, (Solebury Township), Solebury, Bucks County, PA: 1 photo and 1 data page, at Historic American Buildings Survey

Historic American Buildings Survey in Pennsylvania
Farms on the National Register of Historic Places in Pennsylvania
Georgian architecture in Pennsylvania
Houses completed in 1820
Houses in Bucks County, Pennsylvania
National Register of Historic Places in Bucks County, Pennsylvania